Rowland Unified School District is a school district in the San Gabriel Valley, Los Angeles County, California. Its headquarters are in Rowland Heights, an unincorporated area in the county.

RUSD, with 23 schools and over 16,000 students, serves Rowland Heights, small portions of the cities of Industry, La Puente, Walnut, and West Covina and the entire unincorporated community of South San Jose Hills.

Schools

High schools
 Nogales High School
 Rowland High School

Adult school
 Rowland Adult and Community Education

Alternative schools
 Community Day School
 Santana High School
 Rowland Assistive Technology Academy

K-8 schools
 Stanley G. Oswalt Academy 
 Ybarra Academy of the Arts and Technology
 Telesis Academy of Science and Math

Intermediate schools (Middle)
 Alvarado Intermediate School
 Giano Intermediate School

Primary schools (Elementary)

 Blandford
 Hollingworth
 Hurley
 Jellick
 Killian
 Northam
 Rorimer
 Rowland
 Shelyn
 Villacorta
 Yorbita
On each elementary school campus sans Oswalt, RUSD has preschool programs.

Board of Education

The Rowland Unified School District Board of Education is composed of five members and they are elected every four years and by geographical district. The plurality elections are held in November of even-numbered years.

References

External links

 

School districts in Los Angeles County, California
City of Industry, California
La Puente, California